Mad is an EP released by English heavy metal band Raven in 1986, after the debacle of the album The Pack Is Back, which received very bad reviews and insignificant commercial success. The songs of this EP mark the return to a more aggressive and metallic sound. It has never been re-released on CD. Its tracks were released as bonus tracks on other CD releases.

Track listing

Credits

Raven
John Gallagher - bass, vocals
Mark Gallagher - guitar
Rob Hunter - drums

Production
Nelson Ayres, Paul Higgins - engineers, mixing
 Dennis King - mastering

References

Raven (British band) albums
1985 EPs
Atlantic Records EPs